Room in the House is a 1955 comedy-drama film directed by Maurice Elvey. The film's screenplay, by Alfred Shaughnessy, is based on Eynon Evans's play Bless This House. The film was produced by Alfred Shaughnessy for Act Films Ltd.

Plot
Ageing widow Betsy Richards stays with each of her three sons in turn, to find out who she'd prefer to spend the rest of her days with. When her favorite, Hugh, leaves for America, she becomes distressed. Finally, the sons rally round and buy Betsy her own cottage in the village.

Cast and characters

References

External links

1955 films
1950s English-language films
1955 comedy-drama films
British black-and-white films
Films directed by Maurice Elvey
British comedy-drama films
1950s British films